The Tenth Muse may refer to:

 Sappho (c. 630 – c. 570 BC), Greek poet
 Juana Inés de la Cruz (1651–1695), Mexican poet and playwright
 Tenth Muse, a comic book series by Darren G. Davis
 The Tenth Muse: My Life in Food, a book by Judith Jones
 The Tenth Muse, a book by Catherine Chung

See also
 The Tenth Muse Lately Sprung Up in America, a book of poetry by Anne Bradstreet